Sheriffhales is a civil parish in Shropshire, England.  It contains 32 listed buildings that are recorded in the National Heritage List for England.  Of these, two are listed at Grade II*, the middle of the three grades, and the others are at Grade II, the lowest grade.  The parish contains the villages of Sheriffhales and Chadwell and smaller settlements, and is otherwise mainly rural.  In the parish is Lilleshall Hall, a country house, later a National Sports Centre.  This is listed, together with associated structures.  Most of the other listed buildings are houses, cottages, farmhouses and farm buildings, the earliest of which are timber framed or have timber-framed cores. The remainder of the listed buildings include a church, items in the churchyard, a wayside cross, a milestone and a milepost, a watermill, and a war memorial. 


Key

Buildings

References

Citations

Sources

Lists of buildings and structures in Shropshire